An equestrian statue of Charles II trampling Cromwell stands near Newby Hall in North Yorkshire, England. It was previously sited at Gautby Hall in Lincolnshire, and was originally installed at the Stocks Market in the City of London. It is a Grade II listed building.

The 17th-century statue is made of Carrara marble. It shows a mounted man in armour riding a horse, which is walking over and trampling a human figure prostrate on the ground. The rider holds bronze reins in his left hand and a staff in his right hand. The sculpture stands on a tall plinth of stone ashlars, with moulded base and cornice, and rounded ends.

The original sculpture was made in Italy, but the sculptor is not known. It portrayed the Polish commander John III Sobieski riding down a Turkish soldier (said by some sources to commemorate his victory at the Battle of Vienna in 1683, although it pre-dates the battle by at least a decade).

The sculpture may have been made for the King of Poland or the Polish ambassador in London, but it was bought in c. 1672 by the London goldsmith and banker Sir Robert Vyner, 1st Baronet, who was a strong supporter of Charles II, and who had made Charles's new coronation regalia to replace items sold or destroyed before or under the Commonwealth. Vyner had the head of the rider remodelled by Jasper Latham to resemble Charles. The figure interpreted as "Cromwell" retains a distinctly Turkish appearance, including a turban.  

Vyner had offered in 1668 to donate a statue of Charles for the Royal Exchange when it was rebuilt after the Great Fire of London, but this offer was rejected. Vyner served as Lord Mayor of London in 1674–75, and he presented the statue to the parish of St Stephen Walbrook and had the statue installed in 1675 in the Stocks Market. This was the location of the last fixed stocks in the City of London, near Cornhill, above the outlet of a conduit fed by a lead pipe from Tyburn.

In a satirical poem, Andrew Marvell wondered whether the statue was deliberate revenge for the losses Vyner had suffered with the Stop of the Exchequer,
When each one that passes finds fault with the horse. 
Yet all do affirme that the King is much worse

In another poem Marvell imagined the horse in discussion with the horse from the equestrian statue of Charles I, re-erected later the same year at Charing Cross, the two horses together comparing their riders and berating the state of the nation.

The statue was removed in 1739 to permit the construction of the Mansion House on the site of the Stocks Market, and was given back to Vyner's grandnephew, also Robert Viner. Some years later, the statue was erected at the Vyner family estate at Gautby Hall. Lady Mary Robinson, daughter of Thomas de Grey, 2nd Earl de Grey, married Henry Vyner, and after she had inherited Newby Hall in 1859 the statue was relocated there in 1883, where it remains. It received a Grade II listing in 1967.

References

 
 Equestrian Statue at Newby Hall. Formerly in Cornhill and the Stocks Market in London, David Bridgwater
 London, Volumes 5–6, edited by Charles Knight, p. 68

External links
 

17th-century sculptures
Charles II of England
Equestrian statues in the United Kingdom 
Grade II listed buildings in North Yorkshire